Miab (also Romanized as Mīāb, Meyāb, and Mīyāb) is a village in Harzandat-e Sharqi Rural District, in the Central District of Marand County, East Azerbaijan Province, Iran. At the 2006 census, its population was 624, in 227 families.

References 

Populated places in Marand County